Thrupe Lane Swallet is a  geological Site of Special Scientific Interest in Somerset, notified in 1992. It is also a Geological Conservation Review site.

The name Thrupe Lane comes from the nearby hamlet of Thrupe, which in Anglo-Saxon meant dairy farm.

The swallet is a small, single pothole cave system that is dominated by a series of deep and mainly vertical passages, which follow fault lines, natural joints in the rock and mineral veins. The stream that flows through the cave is one of those that feeds St Andrew's Wells in the grounds of the Bishop's Palace in Wells.

Thrupe Lane Swallet was first entered in 1974 following digging by three caving groups. The entry shaft has been blasted open to ensure a stable entrance.

See also 
 Caves of the Mendip Hills

References

External links 
 English Nature website (SSSI information)

Caves of the Mendip Hills
Sites of Special Scientific Interest in Somerset
Sites of Special Scientific Interest notified in 1992
Limestone caves
Geology of Somerset